Beatrice Batty (1833–1933) was an English writer and author of ten novels.

Personal life 
She was born in London, and was the eldest daughter of Henry Stebbing, an English cleric and literary editor. Her siblings included journalist William Stebbing, zoologist Thomas R.R. Stebbing, and novelist Grace Stebbing.

Batty was educated at a Moravian boarding school in Neuwied, in the Rhineland in west Germany. Her experiences there formed the basis for her first book, An English Girl's Account of a Moravian Settlement, which was published in 1858.

In 1860 she married Robert Braithwaite Batty, and they went to India to do missionary work. He died of dysentery and she returned to England.

Writing career 
Batty wrote at least ten novels, and was editor-in-chief of Coral magazine. She carried on a longtime personal correspondence with John Horden, the first Anglican Bishop of Moosonee, Canada, and in 1893 she published a book of extracts from his letters and papers called Forty-Two Years Amongst the Indians and Eskimo; Pictures from the Life of the Right Reverend John Horden, First Bishop of Moosonee.

From 1892 she lived in Oxford. Batty was a 'fervent attender of societies' and was member of the Oxford University Anthropology Society. Batty gave much of her collection from her travels to the Pitt Rivers Museum, Reading Museum and her papers to the Bodleian Library.

Batty died on 30 April 1933, whilst living in Reading.

References

1833 births
1933 deaths
19th-century English novelists
19th-century English women writers
19th-century English writers
English women novelists
Victorian novelists
Victorian women writers
Writers from London